Cecil William (Cec) Creedon (9 March 1922 – 3 August 2014) was a politician in the State of South Australia.

History
Cecil Creedon was born in Westbury, Tasmania the eldest of four children of Cecil and Adele Creedon. He was educated at a Catholic school in Westbury.

He joined the Royal Australian Air Force in 1941 and worked as a Leading Aircraftman in Laverton, Victoria throughout the Second World War.

He joined the Labor Party in 1948 and remained a member for most of his life. He married in 1946, to Jessie Green from South Australia. They settled in Gawler, South Australia, where he served as a councillor for many years and was Mayor 1972–1978.

He was elected to a Midlands district seat in the Legislative Council for the Labor Party in March 1973 (Labor's first MLC outside the metropolitan area), and remained a member through the change to a single electorate in 1975, retiring in December 1985.

Family
Cecil W. Creedon married Jessie (died 2010) on 23 February 1946; they had one daughter and four sons.

References

External links
Tony Piccolo M.P. for Light, News release

Members of the South Australian Legislative Council
Mayors of places in South Australia
South Australian local councillors
Royal Australian Air Force personnel of World War II
1922 births
2014 deaths
Australian Labor Party members of the Parliament of South Australia